The German Cycling Network (German: Radnetz Deutschland) is the national cycling route network of Germany. There are currently 12 such long-distance cycling routes, called D-Routes (the "D" stands for "Deutschland’" i.e. Germany) criss-crossing the German nation and these were established mainly to promote bicycle tourism.

Part of the German Nationaler Radverkehrsplan (National Cycling Plan), the project to establish the German Cycling Network ran over a 10 year period, from 2002 to 2012.

D-Routes

Future expansion
In the summer of 2012, in the Nationale Radverkehrsplan 2020 (National Cycling Plan 2020), it was decided that the German sections of the Iron Curtain Trail (which is also cycling route, known as EuroVelo 13) would be included as part of the German Cycling Network. Other than this there are currently no further plans for expansion.

See also
 EuroVelo
 LF-routes, the national cycling route network of the Netherlands.
 National Cycle Network, the national cycling route network of the United Kingdom.

References

External links
Bon Voyage on the German Cycle Network

National cycling route networks